Renuka is a genus of beetles in the family Monotomidae, containing the following species:

 Renuka madagascarensis Pal, 2000
 Renuka rita Sen Gupta, 1988

References

Monotomidae
Cucujoidea genera